Gonioctena olivacea  is a species of leaf beetle native to Europe.

References

External links
Images representing Gonioctena at BOLD

Chrysomelinae
Beetles described in 1771
Beetles of Europe
Taxa named by Johann Reinhold Forster